Sanfelice is a surname. Notable people with the surname include:

Ferdinando Sanfelice (1675–1748), Italian architect and painter
Gennaro Sanfelice (1622–1694), Italian Roman Catholic prelate 
Giovanni Sanfelice, Italian Roman Catholic prelate
Giuseppe Sanfelice (1615–1660), Italian Roman Catholic prelate 
Luisa Sanfelice (1764–1800), Italian aristocrat